Stefano Gabellini (born 18 April 1965 in Pesaro) is an Italian racing driver. He has raced in such series as Superstars Series, where he has been a two-time runner-up, and was International Superstars Series champion in 2008.

References

External links
 
 

1965 births
Living people
People from Pesaro
Italian racing drivers
Superstars Series drivers
European Touring Car Championship drivers
Sportspeople from the Province of Pesaro and Urbino
BMW M drivers